Robert Blake Yardley (1858–1943) was a British Barrister and philatelist who signed the Roll of Distinguished Philatelists in 1921. He was a member of the Yardley soap manufacturing family.

Yardley's worldwide collection was auctioned by H.R. Harmer over sixteen days in 1944–45.

Publications
The Dies of the Postage Stamps of Portugal of the Reigns of Dona Maria II and Dom Pedro V. 1907.
The Samoa Express Postage Stamps. 1916.

References

British philatelists
1858 births
1943 deaths
Signatories to the Roll of Distinguished Philatelists
British barristers
Presidents of the Royal Philatelic Society London